Aigialus mangrovis is a fungus species of the genus of Aigialus. Aigialus mangrovis has been first isolated from the mangrove Rhizophora mucronata in Maharashtra in India.

References

Fungi described in 1987